Speculative design is a design practice that is concerned with future design proposals of a critical nature. The term "speculative design" was popularised by Anthony Dunne and Fiona Raby as a subsidiary of critical design. The aim is not to present commercially-driven design proposals but to design proposals that identify and debate crucial issues that might happen in the future. Speculative design is concerned with future consequences and implications of the relationship between science, technology, and humans. It problematizes this relation by proposing provocative future design scenarios where technology and design implications are accentuated. These provocative design proposals are meant to trigger the debate about future challenges. Speculative design proposals might seem subversive and irreverent in nature as they are meant to initiate discussions not to be market products.

Definition 
Dunne and Raby, the researchers who coined the term speculative design, describe it as:
 
Therefore, speculative design is used to challenge preconceptions, raise questions and to provoke debate. It focuses on the future and opens the door for designers to question “how things might be?" 

James Auger claims Speculative design "combines informed, hypothetical extrapolations of an emerging technology’s development with a deep consideration of the cultural landscape into which it might be deployed, to speculate on future products, systems and services”. 

Speculative designers develop alternative presents to ask the question of "why things are the way they are now?" so that they can project on a future scenario. James Auger explains that these alternative presents can always make radical interventions to the current practices and evolving technologies  by applying different ideologies and practices.  Speculative design emphasizes the “philosophical inquiry into technological application”; it tends to take the discussion on technology beyond the experts to a broad population of the audience. The resulting artifacts often appear subversive and irreverent in nature; they look different to the public, and this is the key behind triggering discussions and stimulating questions. 

Speculative design can be distinguished from traditional design  and affirmative design   as the latter types are considered the conventional design that operates within the commercial borders where the aim of designing is profitability. However, speculative design does not aim to be profitable but can be considered an exploratory design genre. In particular, as a Research through Design (RtD) approach, at which knowledge can be gained through reflection on practice approach.

Origins and early attempts 

Anti-design and  Italian radical design could be considered as ancestors of speculative design. However, the format of speculative design as we know it today is derived from the critical design practice. Both are connected and use similar approaches. Dunne and Raby described critical design as a practice that “uses speculative design proposals to challenge narrow assumptions, preconceptions, and givens about the role products play in everyday life”.  Critical design is a form of design that uses design tools and process not to solve a problem but to rethink the borders and parameters of a problem from a critical point of view Dunne and Raby explained the term further in their book ‘Design Noir: The Secret Life of Electronic Objects,’ as “Instead of thinking about appearance, user-friendliness or corporate identity, industrial designers could develop design proposals that challenge conventional values”.

The relationship between speculative design and critical design can be seen from Matt Malpass identification of the current contemporary design practices into three classifications; the first is associative design, the second is speculative design, and the third is critical design. Speculative design is a form of critical design that is concerned with future proposals. It examines future scenarios to ask the question of “what if?”. 

Some attempts of the Italian radical design can be considered as speculative design. For instance, Ettore Sottsass worked on “The planet as a festival” in 1973. Speculative design is inspired by the attitude and position of the Italian radical design, yet does not necessarily imitate its format and motivations.

Motivation 

The motivation behind speculative design is defying the capitalist-driven design directions and to showcase how this negatively impacted the design practice. Dunne and Raby explain this by noting that design has been hyper-commercialized during the 1980s. Socially oriented designers who were celebrated before then were no longer seen as adding value to the potential of design to generate wealth. Design struggled to find an alternative social model to align with but the capitalist economy. However, after the financial crash in 2008, the interest in finding other alternatives to the current design models was triggered. In this sense, the role of design is to be a catalyst in producing alternative visions rather than being the source of vision itself.    

Speculative designers' motivation is to take a position or an attitude towards the current design practice and propose alternatives. Designers might have different points of view about how they would present a design idea or focal issue. Bruce and Stephanie Tharp identify the different positions designers could take towards their projects; these could be: declarative, suggestive, inquisitive, facilitative, and disruptive.

Auger extends this discussion on explaining what speculative design should do by mentioning aspects for it:

 " Arrange emerging (not yet available) technological ‘elements’ to hypothesise future products and artefacts, or
 apply alternative plans, motivations, or ideologies to those currently driving technological development in order to facilitate new arrangements of existing elements, and
 develop new perspectives on big systems."

Aiming at: 

 " Asking ‘what is a better future (or present)?’
 Generating a better understanding of the potential implications of a specific (disruptive) technology in various contexts and on multiple scales – with a particular focus on everyday life.
 Moving design ‘upstream’ – to not simply package technology at the end of the technological journey but to impact and influence that journey from its genesis."

In theory 
Speculative design relies on speculation and proposition; its value comes from speculating about future scenarios where design is used in a particular context to showcase a notion or an idea of debate. The most significant aim of speculative design is to enact change rather than conforming to the status quo. According to Johannessen, Keitsch and Pettersen the change aspects can be segmented into three elements:     

 Political and social change, 
 Product value and user experience change and 
 Aesthetics 

Speculative designers do not suggest what a preferable future is; they let society decide what is a preferable future for them, whereas affirmative design, government, and industries actually decide on their preferable future and create it. It encourages the audience to suggest their preferable future that has no direct relevance with today’s perspective of how the future should be and this raises the awareness for society on how they could influence their choices for the future; the logic of the ‘laws’ of future implies that if we strive for something, we can eventually turn it into reality, even if it seems incredible now.

Speculative design triggers the debate about the actions we take today (in the present) that build future events. It encourages the users to be the change of today. It questions technology at early stages; it is concerned with the domestication of technology and upstream engagement. It poses societal and ethical implications to interrogate them. It questions the role of industrial and product design in delivering new science and technology. Speculative design as a subsidiary of critical design is built on the fundamentals Frankfurt school of criticism. Therefore, critical thinking is an essential aspect of speculative design. Critiquing norms, values and why we design is what motivates speculative designers.

Design is thought to be a future-oriented practice by nature.  However, the issue lies in the fact that vast majority of designers tend to abide by technological advancements without interrogating them or questioning the implications of such technology. An example of this is the wide adoption of social media and how this affected society (for example, the social dilemma). 

Designers, in this case, do not attempt to change the future, but rather they tend to adapt their design towards what they can see probable future. In this sense, they see it as something that they can not change. In this context, speculative design aims to influence change by raising questions and provoking debates by implementing designed objects. Speculative design uses objects or prototypes that do imply implicit meanings about complex social and technological issues. 

To highlight the differences between affirmative design and speculative design, Dunne and Raby introduced the A/B Manifesto to contrast their meanings and to highlight what does it mean to be critical or specualtive in design.

In practice 
    
Speculative design can be seen as an attitude or position instead of a process or methodology. This position implies many tools or methods to be used from the designers’ toolkit. It depends on the project and on the case. For example, the designer might adapt the process that is suitable to the focal issue of debate.

Johannsesn et al. identified a three steps process for the speculative design that can be concluded as follows: 

 Step 1 – Define a context for debate

 Step 2 – Ideate, find problems and create a scenario

 Step 3 – Materialise the scenario to provoke an audience 

Tactics, methods, and strategies for speculative design have wide variation depending on the required message to convey. It depends on the designer’s intention and the careful management of the outcome of the design project. Suppose if the speculation was too far in the future. In that case, it might be difficult to relate to and digest by the audience, which leads to low engagement by the intended audience. Yet, if the speculation was very subtle or implicit, the project might look like a normal or traditional design project that would be unnoticeable and will result in lack of engagement as well. This balance should be taken care of by the designer. 

For this reason, speculative design needs a “perceptual bridge” between what the audience identifies a per their reality and the fictional elements in the speculative concept. 

Tactics and strategies used by speculative design can be:

 Reductio Ad Absurdum
 Counterfactuals
 Ambiguity
 Satire

and the outcome of speculative design can be a project in the form of: 

 Para-functional prototypes
 Post-optimal prototypes

Adjacent practices 
Speculative design has many adjacent practices that might seem similar in terms of format, medium, and dissemination style. These practices are critical design, discursive design, and design fiction. They all share very similar motivations but different purposes or target areas. Their format might also differ. For instance, design fiction would use diegetic prototypes in projects with a video format. However, Experiential futures might involve people in situations that resemble future situations.

Criticism 

Speculative design is criticized for several reasons. The most significant criticism for critical and speculative design would be based on the understanding that design is not functional or useful, so it cannot be considered as design. The grounds for criticism are built on the basic understanding of design as a problem-solving activity. In contrast, speculative design is concerned with problem finding. It does not create functional objects at the end but rather problematizes an issue or social implication.       

Other criticism would be directed towards speculative design as it does sometimes present dystopian futures that do resemble the lives of other parts of the world. It can sometimes be considered as a niche practice that is only presented in highly intellectual venues such as MOMA and V&A Museum. It does look at first world problems rather than global futures. 

Another criticism for speculative design is dissemination and reflection. The format and venues of presenting speculative design proposals do not imply a methodological approach for engaging with the audience and broader society. This is what Bruce and Stephanie Tharp call (a message in a bottle).

See also 
Critical design
Critical making
Design fiction
Dunne & Raby

References 

Critical design
Futures techniques
Industrial design